Association Sportive des Douanes de Lomé is a Togolese football club based in Lomé. They play in the top division in Togolese football. Their home stadium is Stade Agoè-Nyivé.

Achievements
Togolese Championnat National: 2
 2002, 2005
Coupe du Togo: 1
 2004

Performance in CAF competitions
CAF Champions League: 2 appearances
2003 – First Round
2004 – Second Round

CAF Confederation Cup: 2 appearances
2005 – First Round
2014 – First Round

Current squad

External links
Team profile – soccerway.com

Football clubs in Togo
Football clubs in Lomé
1961 establishments in Togo
Association football clubs established in 1961